The 1966–67 Norwegian 1. Divisjon season was the 28th season of ice hockey in Norway. Eight teams participated in the league, and Valerenga Ishockey won the championship.

First round

Final round

External links 
 Norwegian Ice Hockey Federation

Nor
GET-ligaen seasons
1966 in Norwegian sport
1967 in Norwegian sport